Ángela Salvadores Álvarez (born 10 March 1997) is a Spanish basketball player for Galician team Durán Maquinaria Ensino. She played for Duke Blue Devils during the 2015–16 season.

Club career

Early years
Salvadores started playing basketball in León, firstly at CD Maristas and later at CB Aros before joining the Segle XXI, the basketball team promoted by the Spanish Basketball Federation.

With Segle XXI, she joined the Liga Femenina 2 team in 2013, averaging 15.4 points per game when she was only 16 years old. One season later, Salvadores signed for one year with Rivas Ecópolis and debuted in Liga Femenina. She averaged 14.6 points per game.

Duke Blue Devils
In the summer of 2015, Salvadores left Spain to play in the NCAA Division I with the Duke Blue Devils during the 2015–16 season.

Perfumerías Avenida
On 27 April 2016, Perfumerías Avenida announced an agreement with Salvadores for the next three seasons.
At the end of the first season, she decided to move to Hungarian team UNIQA Sopron

Sopron Basket
In her first season in Hungary, Salvadores reached the Final Four of the 2017–18 EuroLeague Women, finishing as runner-up. She won the 2018 Hungarian League

EuroLeague statistics

International career
Salvadores played with all the youth categories of the Spanish women's national team.

On 6 July 2014, she scored 40 points against United States in the final game of the 2014 Under-17 World Championship but finally Spain lost by 75–77.

References

External links
Profile at FIBA
Profile at Spanish Basketball Federation

1997 births
Living people
Duke Blue Devils women's basketball players
Guards (basketball)
Los Angeles Sparks draft picks
Spanish expatriate basketball people in the United States
Spanish women's basketball players
Spanish women's 3x3 basketball players
Sportspeople from Oviedo